Oscar II Land is the land area between Isfjorden and Kongsfjorden on Spitsbergen, Svalbard.

The area is named after Oscar II of Sweden. Older name variants are Oscar II's Land and Terre Oscar II.

The Hofgaardtoppen mountain is the highest peak in Oscar II Land.

References

Geography of Svalbard
Spitsbergen